Aldoxorubicin (INNO-206) is a tumor-targeted doxorubicin conjugate in development by CytRx. Specifically, it is the (6-maleimidocaproyl) hydrazone of doxorubicin. Essentially, this chemical name describes doxorubicin attached to an acid-sensitive linker (N-ε-maleimidocaproic acid hydrazide, or EMCH).

The proposed mechanism of action is as follows:
 After administration, aldoxorubicin rapidly binds endogenous circulating albumin through the EMCH linker.
 Circulating albumin preferentially accumulates in tumors, bypassing uptake by other non-specific sites including heart, bone marrow and gastrointestinal tract.
 Once albumin-bound aldoxorubicin reaches the tumor, the acidic environment of the tumor causes cleavage of the acid sensitive linker.
 Free doxorubicin is released at the site of the tumor.

Clinical trials 
Five phase I trials for safety characterization have been completed. Several phase II and III trials are underway.

Phase II 
As of January 2017, there are 6 phase II clinical trials in progress:
 Second-line therapy for patients with glioblastoma
 Treatment of HIV-positive patients with Kaposi's sarcoma
 Combination therapy of ifosfamide and aldoxorubicin for treatment of metastatic or locally advanced sarcoma
 Comparison of aldoxorubicin to the gold-standard treatment, topotecan, for metastatic small cell lung cancer
 Treatment of advanced or metastatic pancreatic ductal adenocarcinoma
 Comparison of aldoxorubicin and doxorubicin for patients with metastatic or locally advanced carcinoma

Phase III 
A phase III trial for patients with relapsed soft tissue sarcoma comparing aldoxorubicin with several other chemotherapeutics is expected to complete in 2018. In November 2016, CytRx announced that preliminary results had been positive.

References

Further reading 

 
 
 
 

Antineoplastic and immunomodulating drugs
Experimental cancer drugs
Anthracyclines
Maleimides